Lawrence Patrick (1920 – April 30, 2006)  may well be considered one of the fathers of the crash test dummy. Between 1960 and 1975, while a biomechanics professor at Detroit's Wayne State University, Patrick described his work by saying "I was a human crash-test dummy". Patrick allowed himself to be subject to over 400 rocket sled rides, crushing blows to the head and body, and other forms of physical abuse in an effort to develop a body of data on how the human body responded in a vehicle accident. One of his students, Harold Mertz, went on to develop Hybrid III, the current worldwide standard crash test dummy. Lawrence also subjected himself to a 50 pound pendulum to the breast plate to test the effects of a steering column on a human. Lawrence died of Parkinson's disease on April 30, 2006 at the age of 85.

References

1920s births
Wayne State University faculty
2006 deaths
Neurological disease deaths in North Carolina
Deaths from Parkinson's disease